Speculum al foder is a 15th-century Catalan anonim text discovered in the 1970s. This text is significant as it is a rare example of known Medieval treatise describing the art of sexual positions (others examples include Aretino's I Modi ["The Ways"], also known as "The Sixteen Pleasures").

References

Medieval Catalan literature
Sex manuals